The 62nd Golden Globe Awards, honoring the best in film and television for 2004, were held on January 16, 2005. The nominations were announced on December 13, 2004.

Sideways received the most nominations (7). The Aviator won the most awards, with 3 (including Best Motion Picture – Drama). Finding Neverland had the most nominations (5) without a single win.

Winners and nominees

These are the nominees for the 62nd Golden Globe Awards. Winners are listed at the top of each list.

Film

The following films received multiple nominations:

The following films received multiple wins:

Television

The following programs received multiple nominations:

The following programs received multiple wins:

Ceremony

Presenters 

 Patricia Arquette
 Mischa Barton
 Halle Berry
 Pierce Brosnan
 Jim Carrey
 Glenn Close
 Marcia Cross
 Claire Danes
 Minnie Driver
 Will Ferrell
 Laurence Fishburne
 Jennifer Garner
 Topher Grace
 Teri Hatcher
 Goldie Hawn
 Dustin Hoffman
 Ron Howard
 Kate Hudson
 Felicity Huffman
 Michael Imperioli
 Samuel L. Jackson
 Scarlett Johansson
 Melina Kanakaredes
 Diane Keaton
 Nicole Kidman
 Diane Kruger
 Diane Lane
 Anthony LaPaglia
 Eva Longoria
 Matthew McConaughey
 Ewan McGregor
 Megan Mullally
 Mike Nichols
 Al Pacino
 Mekhi Phifer
 Lisa Marie Presley
 Prince
 Usher Raymond
 Tim Robbins
 Nicollette Sheridan
 Sylvester Stallone
 Meryl Streep
 Charlize Theron
 Goran Visnjic
 Mark Wahlberg
 Naomi Watts
 Renee Zellweger

Cecil B. DeMille Award 
Robin Williams

Miss Golden Globe 
Kathryn Eastwood (daughter of Clint Eastwood & Jacelyn Reeves)

Awards breakdown 
The following networks received multiple nominations:

The following networks received multiple wins:

See also
 77th Academy Awards
 25th Golden Raspberry Awards
 11th Screen Actors Guild Awards
 56th Primetime Emmy Awards
 57th Primetime Emmy Awards
 58th British Academy Film Awards
 59th Tony Awards
 2004 in film
 2004 in American television

References

062
2004 film awards
2004 television awards
January 2005 events in the United States
Golden